Andrej Đokanović (born 1 March 2001) is a Bosnian professional footballer who plays as a defensive midfielder for Bosnian Premier League club Sarajevo and the Bosnia and Herzegovina national team.

Đokanović started his professional career at Sarajevo.

A former youth international for Bosnia and Herzegovina, Đokanović made his senior international debut in 2021.

Club career

Sarajevo
Đokanović started playing football at a local club, before joining the youth academy of his hometown club Sarajevo. In November 2017, he signed his first professional contract with the team. He won his first trophy with the club on 15 May 2019, by beating Široki Brijeg in Bosnian Cup final. On 25 May, he made his professional debut against GOŠK Gabela at the age of 18.

In August, Đokanović extended his contract until June 2024.

On 26 August 2020, he scored his first professional goal in UEFA Champions League qualifier against Dynamo Brest.

International career
Đokanović represented Bosnia and Herzegovina on all youth levels.

In May 2021, he received his first senior call-up, for friendly games against Montenegro and Denmark. He debuted against the latter on 6 June.

Career statistics

Club

International

Honours
Sarajevo
Bosnian Premier League: 2018–19, 2019–20
Bosnian Cup: 2018–19, 2020–21

References

External links

2001 births
Living people
Footballers from Sarajevo
Serbs of Bosnia and Herzegovina
Bosnia and Herzegovina footballers
Bosnia and Herzegovina youth international footballers
Bosnia and Herzegovina under-21 international footballers
Bosnia and Herzegovina international footballers
Association football midfielders
FK Sarajevo players
Premier League of Bosnia and Herzegovina players